The 2015 FAI Senior Challenge Cup, also known as the 2015 FAI Irish Daily Mail Senior Cup for sponsorship reasons, was the 95th season of the national football competition of the Republic of Ireland. The winners of the competition earned a spot in the first qualifying round of the 2016–17 UEFA Europa League.

A total of 40 teams competed in the 2015 competition, which commenced in March 2015. The teams entered from the 2015 League of Ireland Premier Division and First Division received byes into the second round stage. Four non-league clubs also received byes to the second round. The remaining 12 teams entered at the first round stage. These non-league teams are composed of the sixteen clubs, which reached the fourth round of the 2014–15 FAI Intermediate Cup, and the semi-finalists of the FAI Junior Cup in 2014–15.

Dundalk won the cup after a 1–0 win against Cork City in the final on 8 November.

Teams

First round
The draw for the First Round of the FAI Cup was made on 7 April 2015 at Abbotstown by FAI President Tony Fitzgerald and Brendan Clarke.
20 intermediate and junior clubs were present in the draw.

Second round

The draw for the Second Round of the FAI Cup was made on 6 May 2015 at the Aviva Stadium by Paul McGrath and FAI President Tony Fitzgerald and contained 32 teams, with the 20 League of Ireland teams entering the competition. Ties played on the weekend ending 31 May 2015.

Third round

The draw for the third round took place in Sligo on July 17 and was made by Republic of Ireland manager Martin O'Neill and FAI president Tony Fitzgerald. Fixtures were played on the weekend of August 23.

Quarter-final

The draw for the quarter finals of the Irish Daily Mail FAI Cup were made on August 23 with Irish under 21 manager Noel King and FAI Director of Competitions Fran Gavin overseeing proceedings.		
Ties were played on Friday September 11. The draw featured 6 League of Ireland Premier Division teams and 2 non-league sides.

Semi finals

The draw was made by former Republic of Ireland international Keith Fahey, who was a member of the St Patrick’s Athletic team that won the trophy in 2014, and Fran Gavin, Director of Competitions at the Football Association of Ireland. The draw was broadcast live on RTE Radio One’s Morning Ireland programme and also on RTE News Now. On Friday, October 2 Dundalk defeated Longford Town 2 - 0. Cork City defeated Bray Wanderers 1-0 on Sunday, October 4. The match was broadcast live on RTÉ2.

Final

References

External links
Official website
Full fixtures and results

 
FAI Cup seasons